Akatlar Arena is a multi-purpose indoor arena located in Akatlar, Istanbul, Turkey.  The arena is the home court of Beşiktaş J.K.; it also serves the volleyball team. It is also suitable to host other events, such as concerts.

The Istanbul Municipality handed over its rights to multi-sports team Beşiktaş J.K. after the arena's construction and opening in 2004.

Facilities
There is a  cafeteria, five buffets serving the spectators during matches and exhibitions, VIP resting rooms, and three big and four small lodges for total of 80 persons.

The arena has seven entrances (three for visiting-team supporters), and a different entrance and car park also for VIPs. With complete precautions for fire hazards, there is also a generator placed in case of electrical power outages.

A terrace is available for use in summer time. There are four different locker rooms, which permit the arena to hold two consecutive matches. Each locker room has ten shower baths, three urinals, as well as private wardrobes and massage rooms. There are also four locker rooms for referees.

Notable concerts
Incubus in March 2007
Roger Hodgson on 25 October 2007
Nana Mouskouri in Nov 2007

References

External links
BJK Official Website
Beşiktaş Akatlar Arena

Basketball venues in Turkey
Sports venues in Istanbul
Music venues in Istanbul
Akatlar Arena
Indoor arenas in Turkey
Sports venues completed in 2004
Sport in Beşiktaş
Turkish Basketball League venues
Music venues completed in 2004
Beşiktaş J.K. facilities
21st-century architecture in Turkey